The Mazda Chantez (chassis code KMAA) is a two-door kei car that was introduced by Mazda in July 1972. In more recent testing of a 1972 GF II, 0–100 km/h came up in 35.8 seconds. The engine was installed longitudinally in the front of the vehicle powering the rear wheels, and the spare tire was installed next to the engine on the right side.

 Originally, the Chantez had been planned to use a single-rotor Wankel engine, but the other Kei manufacturers considered this unfair and blocked Mazda's plans. As a result of not being able to build the car they had originally planned, Mazda lost interest in the Kei class and sales halted without a replacement in 1976, on the eve of new Kei car regulations. Mazda did not market another Kei passenger car until 1989 with a reintroduction of the Carol, which was a rebadged Suzuki Alto, and to this day still choose not to make their own engines for the Kei class.

Equipment levels ranged from the lowest spec L (less chrome, body colored bumpers and B-pillars), via the LX, GL, GF, and GL II to the top-of-the-line GF II, which featured a sports interior, radial tires, and available two-tone paint.

In late 1974, anticipating a changing law at the turn of the year, the trunk lid and front bumper were modified to fit larger-size license plates.

References

Chantez
Kei cars
Rear-wheel-drive vehicles
1970s cars